Federico "Fede" Sánchez (4 December 1970 – 25 August 2014) was a professional tennis player from Spain.

Biography
Born in Granada, Sánchez turned professional in 1991 and was based during his career in Barcelona. He won the 1992 Pescara Challenger tournament and while on the Challenger circuit also registered wins over Marcelo Ríos and Alberto Berasategui. In 1993 he reached his highest ranking of 138 in the world with career best performances on the ATP Tour. At Kitzbuhel he won two matches to make the round of 16, then in Palermo made it through to the semi-finals. His run at Palermo included a win over the 40th ranked Emilio Sánchez and a quarter-final victory over Carlos Costa, who retired hurt after losing the first set. He was beaten in the semi-finals by Sergi Bruguera.

For many years after his retirement he taught tennis in Almería. In 2014 he died aged 43, in an accident involving a flight of stairs. Club de Tenis Indalo, the tennis club where he coached, holds an annual memorial tournament in his honour.

Challenger titles

Singles: (1)

References

External links
 
 

1970 births
2014 deaths
Spanish male tennis players
Sportspeople from Granada
Accidental deaths in Spain
Tennis players from Andalusia